The 2017 Illinois State Redbirds football team represented Illinois State University as a member of the Missouri Valley Football Conference (MVFC) during the 2017 NCAA Division I FCS football season. Led by ninth-year head coach Brock Spack, the Redbirds compiled an overall record of 6–5 with a mark of 4–4 in conference play, placing in a three-way tie for fifth in the MVFC. Illinois State played home games at Hancock Stadium in Normal, Illinois.

Schedule

Game summaries

Butler

at Eastern Illinois

at Missouri State

Indiana State

at Northern Arizona

at Southern Illinois

South Dakota

at Youngstown State

Western Illinois

at South Dakota State

North Dakota State

Redbirds drafted

Ranking movements

References

Illinois State
Illinois State Redbirds football seasons
Illinois State Redbirds football